The Samate is language spoken in Samate Village, North Salawati District, Raja Ampat Regency, Southwest Papua. According to residents of Samate, this language is also spoken by residents of Jefman Island (West Jefman and East Jefman). The place where this language is spoken is surrounded by speakers of Ma'ya language.

Isolect
Based on dialectometry calculations, isolect Samate is a language with a percentage difference of 90–100% when compared to the surrounding languages. For example, with Ambel language 95%, Beser language 92%, and Ma'ya language 91.75%.

References

Languages of western New Guinea